Sphingomonas roseiflava  is a bacterium from the genus of Sphingomonas which has been isolated from the plant Setaria viridis in the Ibaraki Prefecture in Japan.

References

Further reading

External links
Type strain of Sphingomonas roseiflava at BacDive -  the Bacterial Diversity Metadatabase	

roseiflava
Bacteria described in 2000